Luboš Rob (born August 5, 1970) is a Czech professional ice hockey player. He was selected by the New York Rangers of the National Hockey League (NHL) in the fifth round, 99th overall, of the 1990 NHL Entry Draft.

Rob made his Czechoslovak Extraliga debut playing with HC České Budějovice during the 1987–88 Czechoslovak Extraliga season. He went on to play 19 seasons and 681 games in the Czechoslovak/Czech Extraliga scoring 215 goals and 303 assists for 518 points while registering 513 minutes in penalties.

Rob's final season in the Czech Extraliga was 2006–07, but he continues to play in the Czech lower leagues.

References

External links

1970 births
Living people
Czechoslovak ice hockey left wingers
Czech ice hockey left wingers
Motor České Budějovice players
HC Sparta Praha players
HC Tábor players
KalPa players
New York Rangers draft picks
VHK Vsetín players
Sportspeople from České Budějovice
Czech expatriate ice hockey players in Finland